The Amplify Voices Award is an annual film award presented by the Toronto International Film Festival. First presented at the 2020 Toronto International Film Festival, the award is presented to three films annually, with one award open to all Canadian feature films and designated as the Amplify Voices Award for Best Canadian Film, and two awards presented to films from anywhere in the world directed by filmmakers who are Black, Indigenous or People of Colour. The winners in both the Canadian and BIPOC categories are selected and presented by the same jury.

As with all of TIFF's juried awards, the jury also have the discretion to name one or more honorable mentions in addition to the overall winners.

Winners
As the award for Best Canadian Film was simply a renaming of TIFF's existing Best Canadian Film award, winners in the Canadian film category are listed in that article; only winners of the BIPOC categories are listed below.

References

Amplify Voices
Awards established in 2020